Webydo (וובידו) is a cloud-based web design platform that allows designers to create advanced HTML5, responsive websites with a built-in CMS, without writing code. Webydo works with the WYSIWYG principle. This platform utilizes tools similar to those used in other software such as Adobe Photoshop or InDesign, but with the ability to design directly in the browser. Designers can drag and drop their design elements on canvas, and Webydo's cloud software automatically generates cross-browser and cross-platform W3C validated HTML code as well as a built-in CMS for dynamic updates changed by the website owner.

Overview

Webydo is a cloud-based software as a service, providing two integrated work environments that can be used directly in the browser: 
A DMS (design management system) professional online software for creating and designing advanced HTML websites.
A CMS (content management system) for content updates by the website owner.

Webydo's DMS has a WYSIWYG design interface that allows designers to drag and drop into the online canvas design elements such as images, texts, videos, flash, galleries, menus, custom designed forms, widgets, or custom HTML code. In July 2013, Webydo's partnership with Ecwid added a built-in e-commerce functionality. Designers can start their clients' sites from scratch on a blank canvas, choose a layout or from pre-made designs (in which each element can be modified later).

When the designer publishes their website, Webydo's code generator automatically creates the HTML code, which is updated to the W3C standards, cross-browser and cross-platform compatible, optimized for search engines and comes with a built-in content management system (CMS) and SEO management tools. Furthermore, the CMS permits further updating, deleting and creating new content on the website by the website owner. Designers can also lock specific design elements, preventing unwanted changes made by their CMS clients and preserving full artistic control.

Webydo also hosts the published websites and provides automatic backups and data protection. The partnership between Webydo and Google Cloud gives access to the latter's content delivery network, permitting uploads to the closest server and subsequent duplication in all the other worldwide servers of the network.

Webydo is a B2B website builder intended primarily for professional designers who want to create advanced custom-made websites for their clients including a CMS, without writing code. Webydo provides a more professional platform, unlike do-it-yourself B2C website builders that target un-professional users and offer simple pre-designed templates. Webydo's cloud system offers professional design tools that eliminate designers' dependency on developers and enable their direct communication with their clients.

Webydo also provides a set of tools intended to help designers build an independent web design business, with a dashboard that permits handling multiple websites.

History

Webydo's software was developed initially as an in-house tool for the web design agency by Shmulik Grizim and Tzvika Steinmetz. These projects started as they identified specific problems in the web designing process, namely the repetitive development of handwritten code amounting to about 70% of website creation budgets and the communication gap between designers and their clients. They thought of a tool which would permit automatic generation of HTML code for an Adobe Photoshop-like graphic design, and which would also make possible the direct involvement of the client in the website ongoing management process. Subsequently, they enrolled a team of mathematicians and developers to create the necessary algorithms for this software.

The new platform was quickly successful and with the potential to be used by web designers worldwide. A new company for this product was opened with investment from Adnan Raya. After Google chose Webydo's technology to provide web solutions for businesses in Israel, some 35,000 websites were rapidly created. Microsoft Israel also drove business to Webydo after selecting it in a competition as one of the 20 most innovative companies in 2012.

Community design

Webydo is a provides the technology as community-lead platform and employs the concept of radical democracy in its development process. Customers can set up the goals or the system development and vote on features that they think should be developed next.

Reception

The main feature highlighted in reviews is the fact that the Webydo code generator manages to replace the developer in the web design process, an achievement described as a "web design revolution". Other remarked features are the rich, intuitive and easy-to-use web design software, providing ample room to manage the professional web design process and the good hosting infrastructure.

References

External links
 

Web design
Web hosting
2012 software
Content management systems